Camp Croft is an unincorporated area and census-designated place (CDP) in Spartanburg County, South Carolina, United States. It was first listed as a CDP prior to the 2020 census. The 2020 census lists a population of 2,110.

The CDP is in eastern Spartanburg County and is bordered to the north by Ben Avon.

The Creek Golf Club is in the center of the community, and Kelsey Creek, a south-flowing tributary of Fairforest Creek and part of the Tyger River watershed, forms the southwest boundary. Croft State Park borders the community to the south.

Demographics

2020 census

Note: the US Census treats Hispanic/Latino as an ethnic category. This table excludes Latinos from the racial categories and assigns them to a separate category. Hispanics/Latinos can be of any race.

References 

Census-designated places in Spartanburg County, South Carolina
Census-designated places in South Carolina